Manuel Cid (born 19 August 1956) is a Mexican equestrian. He competed in two events at the 1984 Summer Olympics.

References

External links
 

1956 births
Living people
Mexican male equestrians
Mexican dressage riders
Olympic equestrians of Mexico
Equestrians at the 1984 Summer Olympics
Equestrians at the 1983 Pan American Games
Pan American Games silver medalists for Mexico
Pan American Games medalists in equestrian
Place of birth missing (living people)
Medalists at the 1983 Pan American Games